Paddockwood is a village in the Canadian province of Saskatchewan within the Rural Municipality of Paddockwood No. 520 and Census Division No. 15. It was named after the town Paddock Wood in Kent, England.

In the early 1900s, Fred Pitts immigrated to the lumberland of Canada. From a log cabin he built there as a home, he set up a post office, collecting letters and parcels on horseback for residents of the settlement. He named the settlement Paddockwood after the village he had left in England.

Paddockwood was the home of the first Red Cross hospital in the British Empire, and was set up after the First World War.

Paddockwood is served by the Paddockwood Public Library  as well as a nine-hole golf course, the Helbig's Forest Course. Paddockwood belongs to the Saskatchewan Provincial Constituency of Saskatchewan Rivers and the Federal Electoral District of Prince Albert.

History 
Paddockwood incorporated as a village on January 1, 1949.

Demographics 

References

Villages in Saskatchewan
Paddockwood No. 520, Saskatchewan
Division No. 15, Saskatchewan